The National Academy of Sciences of Western Armenia (NAS WAS) is a public, non-profit, scientific and educational institution. Its aim is to bring together Armenian scientists from across the Armenian Diaspora. Its political goals are restoring historical truth, seeking Turkey's recognition of the Armenian genocide based on international norms, and the return the occupied lands.

History
The National Academy of Sciences of Western Armenia was founded on 11 March 2015 by the Constitutional Supreme Arbitral Board of Western Armenia as a subsidiary institution.

Presidents
Suren Ghazaryan (founding president)
Artem Sargsyan

Activities
The Academy has a scientific periodical, Gitak. It is published four times a year, edited by Karen Khachatrian.

The academy has incentives: a certificate, a diploma, and a highest award, the "Woodrow Wilson" medal, which rewards outstanding patriotic activities of Armenians and pro-Armenian foreign representatives.

Woodrow Wilson medals have been awarded to Arkady Ter-Tadevosyan (commandos), George V. Chilingar, Baroness Caroline Cox, Rep. congressman Adam Schiff, member of the French parliament Valerie Boyer, and US Senator Anna Eshoo.

See also

Education in Armenia
Recognition of the Armenian genocide
Science and technology in Armenia
Wilsonian Armenia

References

External links
National Academy of Sciences of Western Armenia on Facebook

Research institutes in Armenia
Science and technology in Armenia
Scientific organizations established in 2015